Kwame Nsiah-Apau (born 17 April 1976), known by his stage name Okyeame Kwame and nicknamed Rap Doctor, is a Ghanaian musician, songwriter, creative director and entrepreneur.

Life and career

Early life
Apau was born in Kumasi, Ashanti Region of Ghana. He is the third of six siblings. His two younger brothers, Kwaku Nsiah Boamah nicknamed "Flowking Stone" and Kwaku Nsiah Amankwah nicknamed "Kunta Kinte", also perform as a duo, under the brand name "Bradez". Growing up, Kwame's parents expected him to become a physician, yet he gained interest in rap music from a very young age, when he wrote his own songs and performed at local shows since his days at the Anglican Senior High School in Kumasi.

Tertiary education
Kwame is a product of  Kwame Nkrumah University of Science and Technology where he studied Akan and Sociology for his first degree with formal education in music under the tutelage of Dr Daniel Amponsah a.k.a. Agya Koo Nimo. Agya Koo Nimo taught him Classical Guitar and Philosophy in African Music. Subsequently, he enrolled at the University of Ghana and graduated in 2016 with a master's degree in Strategic Marketing.

He is also an associate co-opted member of the Chartered Institute of Marketing Ghana in recognition of his professional use of marketing in creative arts.

Music career
In 1997 he achieved notoriety as a member of the "Akyeame" hiplife duo, together with fellow Ghanaian Daniel Kofi Amoateng (under the stage name Okyeame Kofi). They recorded together the albums "Nyansapo" ("Witty Knot", 1997), "Nkonsonkonson" ("Shackles", 1998), "Ntoaso" ("Continuity", 2000) and "Apam Foforo" ("New Testament", 2002). He performed solo under his own record label One Mic Entertainment, in Accra since they parted in 2004. He also featured renowned Ghanaian highlife and hiplife artists as Daddy Lumba, Kojo Antwi and Ofori Amponsah.

For declaring himself B.R.A (Best Rapper Alive) in a song he recorded after winning Ghana Music Awards Artist of the Year award in 2009, Okyeame Kwame sparked a conflict with fellow Ghanaian rapper Obrafour, who saw himself more deserving. This resulted in one of the memorable feuds the Ghanaian music scene has seen, with Obrafour challenging Okyeame Kwame to a rap battle on the streets which was never honored. In 2011, after Obrafour had apologized for his actions Okyeame Kwame explained he declined Obrafour's challenge because there was no need for it at the time, as winning Artist of the Year was vindicative enough.

Okyeame Kwame has contributed his due to education and the promotion of scholarship, his rap lyrics (which incorporate didactic themes, social consciousness and poetry) being studied in some Ghanaian universities. He recently came out with a song titled Yeeko ft Ghana's very own highlife artist Kuami Eugene.

Style
Okyeame Kwame raps and sings mostly in Twi dialect of the Akan language of Ghana. However, his versatile prowess sees him do songs in English as well. His stage name Okyeame chosen to reflect his lyrical fluidity means "linguist (of the royal court)" in his native Akan.

Other venues
Aside from musical performances, Kwame launched in 2012 "The Versatile Show", produced by himself and performed biannually at the National Theatre, a theater show in which he blends music with drama and poetry.

Business career
Kwame runs his own record label One Mic Entertainment and also Firm Bridges Communications, co-founded with his wife, and he is partner in the shoe manufacturing company Horseman Shoes. He is also a partner to Sante's Hair for Kids, a hairline business that produces local hair products for kids with his daughter as the Brand Ambasssador.

Corporate associations 
Due to his notoriety as a national icon in native Ghana, Kwame has become an iconic figure for corporate Ghana. He has so far become brand ambassador for MTN Group, GT Bank and Coca-Cola in Ghana, aside being appointed the public relations officer of the Musicians Union of Ghana (MUSIGA) from 2012 and the Ghana Music Right Owner (GHAMRO) in 2014.

From 2015, Kwame was appointed as ambassador for "My African Union, My Voice" campaign launched by the African Union in Addis Ababa as part of the activities of the "State of the Union" (SoTU) – a Pan-African Civil Society Organizations project which is currently being implemented in African countries including Ghana. The stated goals of the campaign are to help creating public awareness of the objectives of the African Union and to promote active citizen participation in the implementation of its protocols, conventions and policy decisions at the level of the member states of the Union.

In the same year, he was appointed ambassador for the Junior Boys Mentoring Conference, a youth-focused non-governmental initiative in Accra which seeks to equip young people with the necessary knowledge and skills that will enable them to tackle challenges as they come into contact with the outside world.

Kwame has also collaborated with MDS Lancet Laboratories on his hepatitis B project, vaccinating more than 10,000 Ghanaians. The screening exercise is aimed at creating public awareness about hepatitis b which has become rampant among Ghanaians.

Research has shown that insurance penetration has been low in Ghana, partly because a chunk of the population have still not come to terms with the relevance of insurance policies. The need therefore arises for insurance companies to diversify in achieving the intended purpose. To this end, Kwame was appointed by the Insurance Awareness Coordinators Group as ambassador for its GET INSURED CAMPAIGN project with the responsibility of whipping up the interest among Ghanaians to get insured particularly against hard times.

In 2020, he was appointed Ambassador for Technical and Vocational Training, TVET by the Ghana education Service with the responsibility of promoting the preference of TVET among Ghanaians. He shares the same platform with Ghana's first lady, Rebecca Akufo-Addo, ace broadcaster, Kwame Sefa Kayi, television host, Berla Mundi, actress, Martha Ankoma, Founder and chief executive officer of McDan Group of Companies, Daniel McKorley, Founder and chief executive officer of Makeup Ghana, Rebecca Donkor among other distinguished men and women in Ghana.

Discography

Kwame released his first solo album "Boshe Ba" (Promised Child) in 2004, just after the breakup of the Akyeame band. He followed in 2008 with "Manwesem" (My Poetry) and in 2011 with "The Clinic", launched at the Aphrodisiac Night Club in Accra. In 2012 he launched "The Versatile Show" ("Konfanko").

In 2020, he teamed up with Jamaica dancehall act, Sizzla Kalonji on a song titled Come Home which urges all Africans in the diaspora to always remember to come back to their mother land.

Film and television

Okyeame Kwame has helped to discover native African talents by working as a judge on music reality shows in Ghana and has also acted in Ghanaian films Ties That Bind, The Comforter and Amsterdam Diary.

Personal life

Kwame has been married since 2009 to Annica Nsiah-Apau and they have two children together, Sir Kwame Bota and Sante Antwiwaa. His two younger brothers are also rappers, using the stage names Flowking Stone and Kunta Kinte. The two are collectively known as Bradez.

Philanthropy

Okyeame Kwame founded in 2009 the Okyeame Kwame Foundation, to raise public awareness on hepatitis B and to provide screening, prevention and education to mitigate the disease in Ghana, backed by MTN Ghana and the MDS-Lancet Laboratories. Periodic screening and vaccination campaigns are held throughout Ghana, attended by hundreds of people who receive free vaccines. In 2014, he staged the Celebrity Car Wash, an event including sports, games and photoshoots with celebrities in East Legon, to raise funds in support of his campaign to provide free vaccination to at least 1000 Ghanaian. The foundation has initiated and sponsored the construction of a hepatitis B treatment facility in Tamale.

For his work in raising the funds to provide free screening for the Ghanaian urban and rural poor, Kwame has been appointed Hepatitis B Ambassador for the Ghana Health Service.

Honors

John Cranley, Mayor of the city of Cincinnati in Ohio USA on 21 November 2016 presented Okyeame Kwame with a Key to the City and declared 17 November each year as ‘Okyeame Kwame Day’ to solemnise his status as International Cultural Ambassador to the city.

Kwame was also honored on 3 February 2017 by the Chartered Institute of Marketing Ghana with the status of an associate co-opted member for his professional use of marketing in the creative arts.

At the 2017 Ghana Music Honours, he was given the best video honour for his song titled Small Small which features MzVee. Adding up, the rapper and philanthropist received a United States Presidential Volunteer Service Award. This award scheme is normally given to Americans but exception was made for the Ghanaian rapper dubbed (Kingdom Humanitarian Award) in recognition of his outstanding contribution towards kicking away hepatitis b.

The People's Choice Practitioners Awards, organised by Media Men Ghana in April 2017 saw Okyeame receive the ‘Outstanding Health Ambassador’ honours presented to him by the Asantehene, his Majesty Otumfuo Osei Tutu II.

Again in 2017, Okyeame Kwame joined David Beckham, Hugh Jackman as UNICEF Super Dad Ambassadors. His selection as ambassador comes at the back of his recognition as a father with an enviable, amazing relationship with his children which had taken centre stage in the media over the years.

Developmental projects

Owing to his willingness to contribute to making Africa a better place, Kwame was recently unveiled as the Climate Change Ambassador for the Ghana Dedicated Grant Mechanism (DGM),  one of the leading projects of Solidaridad, an international Civil Society Organization with 50 years of global experience in facilitating the development of socially responsible, ecologically sound and profitable supply chains. The move is to make him a voice for positive change in the bid to reducing the impact of climate change in Africa Okyeame Kwame and the DGM Project have since visited 52 farming communities in the Brong Ahafo and the Western Regions of Ghana. Some of the activities they engaged in was to use Okyeame Kwame's name as a catalyst to draw the public into small and big gatherings where extensive interactions of climate smart activities and positive land use practices are discussed with community folks.

His foundation, the Okyeame Kwame Foundation has also embarked on a Hepatitis B vaccination project since 2009, to help end the issue of Hepatitis B which was at its peak in Ghana. Since then, the Okyeame Kwame Foundation has screened over 10,000 people and vaccinated some 5000 more for free.

His latest album, Made in Ghana which features some of Ghana's most sensational artistes including Kidi and Kwami Eugene has renewed calls for Ghanaians to feel proud of who they are and to patronize goods made in Ghana in order to promote national identity. It is interesting to know that Kwame's dress style which is often influenced by his root culture, Asante has influenced many youth in Ghana who now prefer making up unique styles with African prints than other prints. Following the launch of the Made in Ghana album and the concept it portrays, the Ministry of Trade and Industry appointed Kwame as Ambassador the for the ‘Made in Ghana’ campaign of the Ministry. Kwame later extended his campaign to the Tourism Ministry where he interacted with the Tourism Minister, Catherine Afeku towards a collaborative effort to instilling in Ghanaians the need to purchase Made in Ghana goods and services.

He is also a board member of World Reader, a non profit organization that delivers e-books to people in the developing world. The organization uses e readers, mobile phones and other digital technology to provide readers in 53 countries with a digital library of over 45,000 book titles.

In May 2021, Okyeame Kwame and his wife launched a book called Love Locked Down.

Awards and nominations

References

Ghanaian rappers
Living people
1976 births
Musicians from Kumasi
Kwame Nkrumah University of Science and Technology alumni
University of Ghana alumni
Male musicians
Ghanaian hip hop musicians